Adam Hughes (born August 2, 1982) is an American poet.

Published works 
Hughes has published two full-length poetry collections, both from NYQ Books (a division of the New York Quarterly).

Petrichor (2010) was his debut collection.
In it, Hughes dealt with family, God, the miraculous and the mundane. Uttering the Holy (2012) built on many of the same themes as Petrichor. Hughes' work has been nominated for a Pushcart Prize, and critics have praised his poetry for being lyrical, for showing a joy in language, and experimental in word usage.

Personal life 
Hughes was born and raised in Lancaster, Ohio. He lives there with his wife and daughter. He has worked as a pastor, a program director for individuals with disabilities, a bereavement coordinator for a hospice, and in drug and alcohol prevention.

References

External links
Hughes' author page at NYQ Books
Hughes' directory page at Poets & Writers

1982 births
American male poets
Poets from Ohio
Living people
21st-century American poets
21st-century American male writers